The 1967 NBA playoffs was the postseason tournament of the National Basketball Association's 1966-67 season. The tournament concluded with the Eastern Division champion Philadelphia 76ers defeating the Western Division champion San Francisco Warriors 4 games to 2 in the NBA Finals.

It was the 76ers' second NBA title in franchise history; their first had come in 1955 as the Syracuse Nationals.

The Boston Celtics were denied the chance to win their ninth straight championship, though they would win the title the following two seasons.

The expansion Chicago Bulls made the playoffs in their debut season, and the New York Knicks returned to the postseason for the first time since 1959. It is the longest gap in Knicks franchise history, a record they matched when they missed the playoffs starting in 2004 and ending in 2011.

The 1967 NBA playoffs marked a change in the league's playoff format; every tournament since 1955 had given the top-ranked team in each division a first-round bye, but starting this season, the NBA upped the number of playoff teams to eight, thereby eliminating a first-round bye for the regular-season division champions.

Bracket

Division Semifinals

Eastern Division Semifinals

(1) Philadelphia 76ers vs. (3) Cincinnati Royals

This was the fourth playoff meeting between these two teams, with the Royals winning two of the first three meetings.

(2) Boston Celtics vs. (4) New York Knicks

This was the sixth playoff meeting between these two teams, with the Knicks winning three of the first five meetings.

Western Division Semifinals

(1) San Francisco Warriors vs. (3) Los Angeles Lakers

This was the first playoff meeting between these two teams.

(2) St. Louis Hawks vs. (4) Chicago Bulls

This was the first playoff meeting between these two teams.

Division Finals

Eastern Division Finals

(1) Philadelphia 76ers vs. (2) Boston Celtics

 Wilt Chamberlain's unofficial quadruple-double with 24 points, 32 rebounds, 13 assists and 12 unofficially counted blocks.

 Wilt Chamberlain's 41 rebounds sets a playoff record for an individual rebounder in a game.

 K.C. Jones's final NBA game.
 Sixers snap Boston's NBA record playoff series winning streak at 18, and their championship reign at eight years.

This was the 11th playoff meeting between these two teams, with the Celtics winning six of the first 10 meetings.

Western Division Finals

(1) San Francisco Warriors vs. (2) St. Louis Hawks

This was the second playoff meeting between these two teams, with the Warriors winning the first meeting.

NBA Finals: (E1) Philadelphia 76ers vs. (W1) San Francisco Warriors

This was the 10th playoff meeting between these two teams, with the 76ers/Nationals winning five of the first nine meetings while based in Syracuse and the Warriors were the original NBA franchise based in Philadelphia.

See also
1967 NBA Finals
1966-67 NBA season

References

External links
Basketball-Reference.com's 1967 NBA Playoffs page

National Basketball Association playoffs
Playoffs

fi:NBA-kausi 1966–1967#Pudotuspelit